Goh Yihan  (born 1981) is a Singaporean legal academic. He is a Judicial Commissioner of the Supreme Court of Singapore. He was previously dean of the Singapore Management University School of Law.

Education 

Goh graduated from the National University of Singapore Faculty of Law with a first class honours LLB in 2006 as the valedictorian. He also topped his second-year examinations and was on the NUS Undergraduate Scholarship. At the 2004 B. A. Mallal Moot, he won both the best oralist and best memorial prizes.

Goh obtained his LLM from Harvard Law School in 2010. He had received the NUS University Overseas Scholarship in 2009 to pursue his postgraduate studies.

Career 
Goh was called to the Singapore Bar in 2011. He had received the Order of Merit in the 2006 bar examinations. In 2013, he became the youngest recipient of the Singapore Academy of Law's Singapore Law Merit Award.

Academic career 
Goh returned to the National University of Singapore Faculty of Law in 2008, where he was a teaching assistant until 2010. He was then appointed as an assistant professor from 2011 to 2014.

Goh left NUS Law in June 2014. He had received four university and faculty teaching awards in six years in NUS.

Goh became an associate professor of law at the Singapore Management University School of Law in July 2014. He was also appointed associate dean (research) in January 2016. Over two years, he received two faculty teaching awards.

Goh became the dean of SMU Law in July 2017, succeeding Yeo Tiong Min. He was appointed for a five-year term after "a [six-month] extensive and rigorous global search". At 35, he was the youngest person to become dean, though he was already "a well-recognised and active expert in the legal profession".

In July 2019, Goh was appointed a full professor of law at SMU.

Legal career 

After obtaining his LLB, Goh was deployed as a Justices' Law Clerk in the Supreme Court from 2006 to 2008. In 2008, he became a Senior Justices' Law Clerk, then served as an Assistant Registrar of the Supreme Court.

Goh has served as amicus curiae to the Court of Appeal on numerous occasions. The court has described his written and oral submissions as "comprehensive, elegantly expressed, and lucidly organised", and as "models of clarity and conciseness".

Goh was appointed senior counsel in January 2021.

On 1 July 2022, Goh was appointed a Judicial Commissioner of the Supreme Court for a two-year term.

Professional appointments and awards 

Goh is a board member of the Singapore Institute of Legal Education and the Singapore Judicial College. He is also a visiting academic at Rajah & Tann.

Selected works 
 Andrew B L Phang and Goh Yihan, Contract Law in Singapore (Alphen aan den Rijn: Wolters Kluwer, 2012)
 Goh Yihan, Singapore Chronicles: Law (Singapore: Institute of Policy Studies-Straits Times Press, 2015)
 Alvin See, Yip Man and Goh Yihan, Property and Trust Law in Singapore (Alphen aan den Rijn: Wolters Kluwer, 2018)
 Goh Yihan, The Interpretation of Contracts in Singapore (Singapore: Thomson Reuters, 2018)
 Goh Yihan, Pursuing Justice and Justice Alone: The Heart and Humanity of Andrew Phang’s Jurisprudence (Singapore Academy of Law, 2022)

References

External links 

 Goh Yihan's CV on the Singapore Management University website

1981 births
Living people
Harvard Law School alumni
Singaporean Senior Counsel
National University of Singapore alumni
Singaporean university and college faculty deans
Law school deans
Academic staff of Singapore Management University School of Law
Singaporean expatriates in the United States